Ricardo Bell may refer to:

 Ricky Bell (singer) (born 1967), American singer
 Ricardo Bell (clown) (1851–1911), English clown and entrepreneur